Sam Fowler (born August 4, 2000) is an American soccer player who currently plays for the Washington Huskies.

Career
Fowler joined the Seattle Sounders FC academy in 2014.  He made his debut for USL club Seattle Sounders FC 2 on July 8, 2017 in a 4–1 defeat to Real Monarchs.

References

External links
Sam Fowler at University of Washington Athletics
U.S. Soccer Development Academy bio
USSF Development Academy bio (demosphere)

2000 births
Living people
American soccer players
Association football goalkeepers
People from Tukwila, Washington
Soccer players from Washington (state)
Sportspeople from King County, Washington
Tacoma Defiance players
Washington Huskies men's soccer players
USL Championship players
People from Issaquah, Washington